This is a list of airports in Djibouti, sorted by location.



Airports

See also 
 Transport in Djibouti
 List of airports by ICAO code: H#HD - Djibouti
 Wikipedia: WikiProject Aviation/Airline destination lists: Africa#Djibouti

References

External links 
 Lists of airports in Djibouti:
 Great Circle Mapper
 Aircraft Charter World

Djibouti
 
Airports
Airports
Djibouti